Esbjerg Speedway Klub or Esbjerg Vikings (part of Esbjerg Motosport) is a speedway club from Esbjerg in Denmark, who compete in the Danish Speedway League.

History
Esbjerg Motorsport was founded in 1929 as the Esbjerg Automobile and Motorcycle Club but the speedway club was formed for the first Danish Championship in 1967. The club race at the Granly Speedway Arena.

The team have won the Danish Speedway League title on 11 occasions in 1967 1969, 1970, 1971, 1972, 1979, 1980, 1981, 1984, 2012 and 2013.

In 2022, the club signed three times world champion Tai Woffinden.

Teams

2022 team

References 

Danish speedway teams